Durham/Northumberland 4 was a regional English rugby union league for teams from North East England which was at the tenth tier of national domestic competition when it folded in 2006. On its inception in 1987 it was the twelfth tire of national domestic competition. Promoted teams moved up to Durham/Northumberland 3 and there was no relegation as this was the basement division for the region. Ever decreasing numbers of teams caused the division to be cancelled at the end of the 2005-06 season with the majority of teams being promoted automatically to Durham/Northumberland 3.

Original teams
When league rugby began in 1987 this division contained the following teams:

Barnard Castle
Civil Service Durham
Jarrovians
Newton Aycliffe
Prudhoe Hospital
Richmondshire
South Tyneside College
Wensleydale

The league's numbers grew and declined throughout the years until the league was cancelled in 2006.

Durham/Northumberland 4 Honours

Durham/Northumberland 4 (1987–1993)

The original Durham/Northumberland 4 was a tier 12 league with promotion up to Durham/Northumberland 3.  It ran until the end of the 1991–92 season when it was cancelled.

Durham/Northumberland 4 (1996–2006)

Durham/Northumberland 4 was reintroduced for the 1996–97 season as a tier 13 league.  Northern league restructuring by the RFU at the end of the 1999-2000 season saw the cancellation of North East 1, North East 2 and North East 3 (tiers 7-9).  This meant that Durham/Northumberland 4 became a tier 10 league until the division was cancelled for the second time at the end of the 2005–06 season.

Number of league titles

Newton Aycliffe (3)
Jarrovians (2)
South Tyneside College (2)
Barnard Castle (1)
Gosforth (1)
Hartlepool Athletic (1)
Richmondshire (1)
Seaham (1)
Wensleydale (1)
West Hartlepool Amateurs (1)
Yarm (1)

Notes

See also
 Durham RFU
 Northumberland RFU
 English rugby union system
 Rugby union in England

References

Defunct rugby union leagues in England
Rugby union in Northumberland
Rugby union in County Durham
Sports leagues disestablished in 2006
2006 disestablishments in England